is a professional association football club based in Ōmiya in Saitama, Japan. Its "hometown" as designated by the league is the whole of Saitama city, which is shared with neighbours Urawa Red Diamonds.  The team currently competes in the J2 League, the Japanese second tier of professional football.

Their home field is : Ōmiya Park Soccer Stadium by the naming rights with occasional games being played at the Kumagaya Athletic Stadium.

Crest 
Omiya Ardija's crest features a squirrel on the right, which is the animal of Omiya. On the left, there are 5 lines, which reference the historic roads that run through Omiya, including the famous Nakasendō, which runs to the Hikawa Shrine, right near Nack5 Stadium.

History
The team were founded in 1968 as NTT Saitama Soccer Selection in Urawa, Saitama and later known as the NTT Kantō Soccer Club in 1969. They were first promoted to the Japan Soccer League (JSL) Division 2 in 1987/88, and when the JSL folded, joined the former Japan Football League.

In 1998 it was separately incorporated as NTT Sport Community K.K. based in Ōmiya to participate in the J. League. The name "Ardija" is a transcription of the Spanish language ardilla (squirrel) which is the mascot of Ōmiya and the park in which their home stadium is located.

Their matches against Urawa Red Diamonds have been called the "Saitama Derby".

In 2005–2007 most of Omiya's home matches were held at Saitama Stadium 2002 and Urawa Komaba Stadium due to expansion works at their home ground. In October 2007 the expansion was complete. On November 11, the re-opening match was held as a J. League season match between the Ardija and Ōita Trinita (1–2).

Omiya competed in the J1 League following an immediate promotion in 2015 after being relegated in 2014. Omiya was relegated again following the 2017 season. They competed in J1 2005 and continued to remain until 2014, following promotion from J2 in 2004 as the second placed team.

Mascots 
Omiya Ardija has two squirrels as its mascots, named Ardi and Miya. Both wear the team kits. According to the club website, Miya is one size smaller than Ardi, being then, slightly shorter than him.

Record as J. League member

Honours
All Japan Senior Football Championship
 Champions: 1981
Regional Promotion Series
Champions: 1986
J2 League
Champions: 2015

Players

Out on loan

 Past (and present) players who are the subjects of Wikipedia articles can be found here

Coaching staff 
For the 2023 season.

Managerial history

Kit evolution

References

External links

Omiya Ardija Homepage 
Omiya Ardija Homepage 

 
J.League clubs
Japan Soccer League clubs
Football clubs in Japan
Association football clubs established in 1969
Nippon Telegraph and Telephone
Sports teams in Saitama (city)
1969 establishments in Japan
Japan Football League (1992–1998) clubs